The U.S. Women's Open is an annual golf competition that was established in 1946. As of 1953, the championship is sanctioned by the United States Golf Association (USGA), which is the governing body of the game in the United States. Previously, the event was played as the "Ladies" Open, and was sanctioned by the Women's Professional Golfers Association from 1946–1948. In addition, the LPGA (Ladies Professional Golf Association) sanctioned this tournament from 1949–1952. This event is one of the five women's major championships. The other major championships are the ANA Inspiration Championship, the LPGA Championship, the Women's British Open, and The Evian Championship. This event has always been played in stroke play with the exception of the first competition in 1946, and is currently the second women's major of the year.

The first trophy presented to the champions was from the Spokane Athletic Round Table, until 1953. The original trophy by the USGA was designed by the silversmith of J. E. Caldwell and Co. of Philadelphia.  This trophy was first presented to the champion in 1953, when Betsy Rawls won, and was retired to the USGA Museum in 1992.  Now, the champion receives the Harton S. Semple trophy, named for a former USGA Committeeman and the USGA President from 1973–1974.  His family and friends commissioned a replacement replica trophy in July 1992.  The first winner to receive it was Patty Sheehan in 1992.

Rawls and Mickey Wright hold the record for the most victories with four.  The most consecutive wins at the event is two by Wright, Susie Berning, Hollis Stacy, Annika Sörenstam, Donna Caponi, Betsy King and Karrie Webb.  The lowest winning score for 72 holes in relation to par is 16-under by Juli Inkster in 1999. The lowest aggregate winning score for 72 holes is 271 by Minjee Lee in 2022. Conversely, the highest winning score for 72 holes in relation to par is 13-over by Murle Lindstrom in 1962. The highest aggregate winning score for 72 holes is 302 by Rawls in 1953 and Kathy Cornelius in 1956, and they won both events in playoffs. The oldest champion was Babe Zaharias in 1954, when she was 43 years 0 months and 6 days old. The youngest champion was Inbee Park in 2008, when she was 19 years 11 months and 17 days old. The U.S. Women's Open has had eight wire-to-wire champions, which are the following: Zaharias in 1954, Fay Crocker in 1955, Wright in 1958, Mary Mills in 1963, Catherine Lacoste in 1967, Berning in 1968, Donna Caponi in 1970, and JoAnne Carner in 1971.

Champions
Key

Multiple champions

This table lists the golfers who have won more than one U.S. Women's Open. Champions who win consecutively are indicated by the years with italics*.
Key

Champions by nationality
This table lists the total number of titles won by golfers of each nationality.

See also
Chronological list of LPGA major golf champions
List of LPGA major championship winning golfers

Notes

 Par is a predetermined number of strokes that a golfer should require to complete a hole, a round (the sum of the total pars of the played holes), or a tournament (the sum of the total pars of each round). E stands for even, which means the tournament was completed in the predetermined number of strokes.  The best score should always be the lowest in relation to par.
 The first event was contested in match play competition.  This means the score is reported differently.
 Betsy Rawls won in an 18-hole playoff over Jackie Pung, 70–77.
 Kathy Cornelius won in an 18-hole playoff over Barbara McIntire (a), 75–82.
 Mickey Wright won in an 18-hole playoff over Ruth Jessen, 70–72.
 JoAnne Carner won in an 18-hole playoff over Sandra Palmer, 76–78. 
 Jane Geddes won in an 18-hole playoff over Sally Little, 71–73.
 Laura Davies won in an 18-hole playoff over Ayako Okamoto and JoAnne Carner, 71–73–74.
 Patty Sheehan won in an 18-hole playoff over Juli Inkster, 72–74.
 Se Ri Pak won in an 18-hole playoff over Jenny Chuasiriporn (a), 73–73, which she won in sudden death after that on the second extra hole.
 Hilary Lunke won in an 18-hole playoff over Angela Stanford and Kelly Robbins, 70–71–73.
 Annika Sörenstam won in an 18-hole playoff over Pat Hurst, 70–74.
 So Yeon Ryu won in a 3-hole playoff over Hee Kyung Seo, 10–13.
 Brittany Lang won in a 3-hole playoff over Anna Nordqvist, 12–15.
 Ariya Jutanugarn won in a 2-hole playoff over Kim Hyo-joo, 8–8, which she won in sudden death after that on the second extra hole.
 Yuka Saso won on the first hole of a sudden-death playoff with Nasa Hataoka, after they tied in the initial 2-hole playoff.

References
General

Specific

External links
LPGA Tour's tournament profile

Champions
U.S. Women's Open